Rjukan is a town and the administrative centre of Tinn municipality in Telemark, Norway. The Tinn municipality council granted township status for Rjukan in 1996. The town has 3,386 inhabitants (January 2007).

History

Rjukan was formerly a significant industrial centre in Telemark, and the town was established between 1905 and 1916, when Norsk Hydro started saltpetre (fertilizer) production there. Rjukan was chosen because Rjukan Falls, a 104-metre waterfall, provided easy means of generating large quantities of electricity. The man with the idea to use the Rjukan falls was Sam Eyde, the founder of Hydro. It is estimated that he, together with A/S Rjukanfoss (later Norsk Hydro), used about two times the national budget of Norway to build the Rjukan power station as well as much of the surrounding town.

Between 1907 and 1911, Norsk Hydro built what was at the time the world's largest hydroelectric power plant at Vemork near Rjukan, and in 1934 built an adjacent hydrogen plant. A by-product of hydrogen production via water electrolysis was heavy water. It was the later Nobel prize winner Odd Hassel who told Norsk Hydro that they were in fact producing heavy water. Norsk Hydro was controlled by the Germans during World War II, was sabotaged twice by the Norwegian resistance movement and bombed by the allied forces.

After 1960, most of the saltpetre production in Rjukan was transferred to Norsk Hydro factories at Herøya in Porsgrunn. Some industry is still present in Rjukan, among them Scan Alloys.

Rjukan Church

Rjukan Church (Rjukan kirke)  was constructed of natural stone with a tower at the entrance to the southwest. The church was consecrated on December 21, 1915. The church was designed by the architects Carl and Jørgen Berner with a cruciform architectural floorplan. The altar image came into place in April 1917 and was painted by Bernhard Folkestad. Seven vaulted windows in the foundation wall have stained glass paintings by Torvald Moseid.

Tourism
Rjukan has a long history of tourism. Tourists have come to the narrow valley for over a century. Rjukan Falls is a famous landmark in Norway, and has been portrayed by several famous artists. The area has good terrain for skiing, and the town is a good starting point for hiking on the Hardangervidda plateau. In the 1860s, Krokan by the Rjukan waterfall was Norwegian Mountain Touring Association's (DNT) first hut. After the waterfall was harnessed for hydropower production, the hut was sold. Today it is re-opened, situated by the main road from Rjukan (Tinn) to Vinje. In later years Rjukan has become famous for its ice climbing possibilities. The season is long, from November to April and the waterfalls are many and varied.

Today, the power plant at Vemork has been made into the Norwegian Industrial Workers Museum where the history of Rjukan and a history of Industrial labour is displayed, in addition to history of the war and the sabotage connected to it.

Between September and March, Rjukan lies in the shadow of the mountains and does not get sunlight due to its location far north. In 2013, at a cost of 5 million Norwegian kroner, large mirrors were placed on the northern mountainside to reflect the Sun, illuminating the town square.

Notable people

Gallery

See also 
 Norwegian heavy water sabotage  
 Norsk Hydro Rjukan
Rjukan–Notodden Industrial Heritage Site

References

External links 

  Rjukan lag of Norwegian search and rescue dogs
 Ice climbing in Rjukan
 Postcard from Tinn
 Postmarks/cancels from Tinn
 Climbing, mountain bike and skiing in Rjukan

Cities and towns in Norway
Populated places in Vestfold og Telemark
Populated places established in the 1900s
Populated places established in the 1910s
Tinn